Hansruedi Bruder (born 2 June 1937) is a retired Swiss sprinter who specialized in the 400 metres.

He was born in Schinznach and competed for the club TV Olten. He finished sixth in the 4 × 400 metres relay at the 1960 Olympic Games with the team René Weber, Ernst Zaugg and Christian Wägli. He won a bronze medal in 4 × 400 metres relay at the 1962 European Championships with Jean-Louis Descloux, Marius Theiler and Bruno Galliker.

He became Swiss champion in 1961, 1962, and 1963. His personal best time was 46.6 seconds (1961).

References

1937 births
Living people
Swiss male sprinters
Athletes (track and field) at the 1960 Summer Olympics
Olympic athletes of Switzerland
People from Brugg District
Sportspeople from Aargau